Wróblik Królewski  (Voroblyk Korolivs’kyi) is a village in the administrative district of Gmina Rymanów, within Krosno County, Subcarpathian Voivodeship, in south-eastern Poland.

The village has a population of 840.

References

Villages in Krosno County
Zakerzonia